Hilarographa phlox is a species of moth of the family Tortricidae. It is found on Java, Indonesia.

References

Moths described in 1977
Hilarographini